Adrian Germanus (born 22 September 1955) is a German fencer. He competed in the team foil events for East Germany at the 1980 and 1988 Summer Olympics.

References

External links
 

1955 births
Living people
German male fencers
Olympic fencers of East Germany
Fencers at the 1980 Summer Olympics
Fencers at the 1988 Summer Olympics
Sportspeople from Hanover